Maxwell John McDonald (18 April 1927 – 28 August 2019) was an Australian politician.

He was born in Essendon, to RAAF officer Ewen McColl McDonald and Hilda Ferguson. He attended state and technical schools before becoming an electrical operations officer and electrician. He joined the Labor Party in 1952, and was three times president of the Eildon-Alexandra branch. In 1982 he was elected to the Victorian Legislative Assembly as the member for Evelyn, moving to Whittlesea in 1985. His seat was abolished in 1992 and he retired.

References

1927 births
2019 deaths
Australian Labor Party members of the Parliament of Victoria
Members of the Victorian Legislative Assembly
Politicians from Melbourne
People from Essendon, Victoria